The 2016 United Football League Cup is the sixth edition of the United Football League Cup which started on February 6 and ended on April 9, 2016. There will be no guest teams with all competing teams also participating in the main UFL competition as per mandate by the Philippine Football Federation. All competing clubs also had to field teams for youth competitions to be organized by the UFL.

The cup adopted a single round robin format with two groups followed by a knockout stage composing of the quarterfinals, semifinals and the final. There is also a foreign player limit of five in the matchday squad of each clubs.

Kaya are the defending champions. Global won the 2016 UFL Cup defeating Ceres in the final.

Draw
The draw for the group stage was held on January 20, 2016.

Group stage

Group A

Group B

Knock-out stage

Quarterfinals

Semi finals

Plate Semi finals

Plate

Third place

Final

Player awards

Season Statistics

Tournament team rankings

|-
| colspan="11"| Eliminated in the quarter-finals
|-

 

|-
| colspan="11"| Failed to qualify in Knock Out stage
|-

|}

Top Goalscorers

Hat-tricks

Own Goals

Notes

References

2016 United Football League (Philippines)
Philippines